Ömer Aysan Barış (born 23 July 1982) is a Turkish former football midfielder. He started at youth team of a local team, Gölcükspor, after which he joined and played for 6 years for the city's biggest club, Kocaelispor at the top level and after the team relegated. He returned to the Süper Lig while playing at Bursaspor. He joined to the Ankaraspor in 2008, but due to injuries he only made a few appearances for them. Trabzonspor made a contract with him in October 2009 for 2.5 years in the last day of the temporary transfer window for the Ankaraspor players. This was because Ankaraspor is relegated from Super Lig by TFF after administrative partnership between Ankaraspor and Ankaragücü was found illegal. Towards the end of the 2009–10 season, coach Şenol Güneş declared in a press conference that Ömer Aysan is to be released from his contract as soon as possible.

Honours 
Kocaelispor
Turkish Cup (1): 2002

References

External links
 

Turkish footballers
Trabzonspor footballers
1982 births
Living people
Süper Lig players
Bursaspor footballers
Kocaelispor footballers
Mersin İdman Yurdu footballers
Turkey under-21 international footballers
Turkey youth international footballers
Association football midfielders
Association football defenders